Central Georgia is the area containing the metropolitan region surrounding the city of Macon, in Bibb County in the U.S. state of Georgia. It abuts the Atlanta metropolitan area, just to the north.

Similar and coextensive names for this region include Middle Georgia and the Heart of Georgia. While no precise definition exists there are several ways to group places as part of the area. A partial list:
The Macon-Warner Robins-Fort Valley, GA Combined Statistical Area (population 417,473). The two components of the CSA are:
Macon Metropolitan Statistical Area (Bibb, Crawford, Jones, Monroe, and Twiggs counties) 
Warner Robins Metropolitan Statistical Area (Houston, Peach, and Pulaski counties)
Counties bordering Bibb are Crawford, Houston, Jones, Monroe, Peach, and Twiggs.
Counties belonging to the Middle Georgia Regional Library System are Bibb, Crawford, Jones, Macon, Twiggs, and Wilkinson.
Counties within the service areas of Central Georgia Technical College and Middle Georgia State University: Baldwin, Bibb, Bleckley, Crawford, Dodge, Dooly, Houston, Johnson, Jones, Laurens, Macon, Monroe, Peach, Pulaski, Putnam, Taylor, Twiggs, Upson, and Wilkinson.
The Macon media market for TV ratings includes Bibb County and all of its neighboring counties, in addition to Baldwin, Bleckley, Dodge, Dooly, Hancock, Johnson, Laurens, Macon, Montgomery, Pulaski, Taylor, Telfair, Treutlen, Washington, Wheeler, Wilkinson, and Wilcox counties.
  Counties belonging to the Middle Georgia Clean Air Coalition: Bibb, Crawford, Houston, Jones, Monroe, Peach, and Twiggs.
Other surrounding counties, such as Butts, Crisp, Jasper, Lamar, Montgomery, Pike, Putnam, Schley, Spalding, Sumter, Taylor, and Upson, are also included in the area at times.

Cities in Central Georgia

Some of the most prominent cities in middle Georgia, each with their own unique history and character, include:

Places with more than 100,000 inhabitants
Macon Pop: 155,369, the area's anchor city, largest city and the center of the area.  Contains museums, institutions of higher education, and historical buildings.  In Bibb County. (Consolidated City-County Government)

Places with 50,000 to 100,000 inhabitants
Warner Robins Pop: 72,531, grew up around Robins Air Force Base.

Other Suburbs, Cities and Counties
Centerville, Rapidly growing suburban city just south of Macon and west of Warner Robins. The Galleria Mall there is the second largest mall in the Macon metropolitan area after the Macon Mall. 
Milledgeville, former state capital. The location of Georgia College and State University. In Baldwin County.
Dublin, a city among the farthest away from Macon that is still considered Middle Georgia.  In Laurens County.
Fort Valley, the location of Fort Valley State University and the Lane Peach Packing Factory and Store.  One of the 8 Blue Bird Bus factories in the U.S and Canada is located in the city.  In Peach County.
Cochran, the location of Middle Georgia State University's Cochran Campus (formerly Middle Georgia College), home of Middle Georgia State University Athletics Department. Also home to the Cochran Motor Speedway, located in Bleckley County.
Forsyth. Tift College was once located here. Sited on I-75 just north of Macon, in Monroe County.
Perry, just south of Warner Robins and the location of the Georgia National Fairgrounds and Agricenter, Perdue and Frito Lay. In Houston County.
Byron, about halfway between Macon and Warner Robins on I-75. The Peach Factory Outlets are located there, In Peach County.
Eatonton, birthplace of authors Joel Chandler Harris (the "Uncle Remus" stories) and Alice Walker (The Color Purple). In Putnam County.

Center 
Twiggs County contains the actual geographic center of the state.

Universities and colleges in Central Georgia 

Middle Georgia State University
Mercer University
Central Georgia Technical College
Wesleyan College 
Georgia Military College
Georgia College
Fort Valley State University

Economy 
The economy in Central Georgia tends to cluster around five areas: aerospace, healthcare and hospitals, kaolin, warehousing and distribution, and heritage and ecotourism. Macon is the region's retail and trade center and the Macon-Bibb county serves as the region's center of employment. The Central Georgia region has been competitive in the United States in terms of economic growth and stability, but within the state of Georgia, the region has not experienced much growth. The region lags behind most other regions in the state in terms of well-being of its residents and overall economic growth. As of 2017, over 46,000 workers from nearby counties commute to the Macon-Bibb county for work. To assist in business growth and development, the Macon Economic Development Commission recruits new businesses and industries to the region. In August 2017 the Canadian based Irving Consumer Products announced plans to build a manufacturing plant in Macon that would create additional jobs.

The Central Georgia Business and Technology Park in Thomaston is a 240-acre facility that houses tenants such as Southern Company, Solutions Pest & Lawn, Criterion Technologies, and Chief Manufacturing.

Houston County is located 75 miles south of the Atlanta International Airport, and home to Georgia's largest industrial complex at the Warner Robins Air Force Base. Houston county has more than 3,000 acres of land for industrial development and one of the lowest property tax rates in middle Georgia. The county is designated one of Georgia’s Entrepreneur Friendly Communities. Houston County has experienced a population growth, from 89,208 in 1990 to a population of 160,000 in 2015.

Major Employers 

Central Georgia's largest employer is the Warner Robins Air Force Base, with more than 22,300 employees as of 2015, followed by Geico with over 5,690 employees and the Medical Center of Central Georgia, with over 4,600 employees.  Other employers in the region include the Houston County Board of Education, Bibb County Board of Education, Houston Healthcare, Perdue Farms, the Macon-Bibb County Government, the Blue Bird Corp, Coliseum Health System, and Frito lay

Notable people 

Clarence Reid, a.k.a. Blowfly - musician and songwriter
Ed Roberts - Physician and founder of MITS where he created the Altair 8800 microcomputer, starting the microcomputer revolution.  It featured Microsoft's first software, the Altair BASIC and employed Bill Gates, Paul Allen, and Monte Davidoff.  
Obie Walker - claimant of the World Colored Heavyweight Championship boxing title in the 1930s
Fish Scales — Alternative Southern Rap Artist
Betty Cantrell — Miss America 2016
Robert Waymouth — Chemistry professor at Stanford University
Melvyn Douglas — Actor
Carrie Preston — Actress
Jack McBrayer — Actor
Jason Aldean — Country Singer
Sonny Perdue — Former Governor of Georgia
Deborah Roberts — ABC News Correspondent
Joel Godard — Late night show tv announcer
Richard "Little Richard" Penniman - Singer

Demographics 
As of 2010, the estimated total population of central Georgia, including the counties of Baldwin, Bibb, Crawford, Houston, Jones, Monroe, Peach, and Twiggs counties, was 445,608 people. The population has grown by 11% over the last 10 years. The fastest growth was reported in Houston County, which saw a population growth of 26.3% followed by Monroe (21.5%) and Jones (21.3%) Counties. The racial make-up of the region is 55.9% white, 38.7% Black and 1.6% asian, with about 1.8% identified as mixed or two more races. Houston county has the highest educational attainment for Bachelor's Degrees (14.5%) and Graduate or Professional Degrees (11.2%) for the population over 25 years old in the Central Georgia region in 2011.

Culture and attractions 
Central Georgia has several cultural attractions that include the Ocmulgee National Monument, Georgia National Fairground, and the Museum of Aviation at the Robins Air Force Base. Macon is home to over 10 museums, 5 tours and 7 annual festivals. Some of the museums include the Tubman African American Museum, the Georgia Sports Hall of Fame, and the Museum of Arts & Sciences.

The region has an abundance of nature and wildlife; the High Falls state park is located just north west of Macon. High Falls was a prosperous Industrial town with several stores, including a mill, a cotton gin and a shoe factory until it fell from prosperity.

Popular Events 

The region hosts several events each year, with Macon, the population center hosting over 20 annual events and has been nicknamed the festival capital of Georgia. Macon's popular events include the International Cherry Blossom Festival, the Bragg Jam, the Ocmulgee Indian Celebration. Other popular events include the Georgia Peach Festival which is hosted in Byron and Fort Valley, and the annual miss Georgia Peach pageant hosted in Fort Valley.

Transportation 
The region features a regional airport, the Middle Georgia Regional Airport. The region is only hours away from the port of Savannah, a major U.S. seaport. Major freeways and highways in the region include, Interstate-75, Interstate-475, Interstate-16, Georgia State Route-80, Georgia State route-23, and Georgia State route-19.

References

 "History, Mission, Vision, and Philosophy | Central Georgia Technical College". Central Georgia Technical College. Retrieved 2018-02-21.
 "Middle Georgia State University - History of Macon State College". mga.smartcatalogiq.com. Retrieved 2018-02-21.
 Peach Shops at Byron
 Big Peach Antiques Mall (Roadside America)
 "Georgia Cities by Population". www.georgia-demographics.com. Retrieved 2018-07-16.
 Piazza, Merissa; Andre, Joe; Tsegah, Elorm M.; Lee, Eunkyu; and Austrian, Ziona, "Central Georgia Regional Analysis: Demographics, Economy, Entrepreneurship and Innovation" (2013). Urban Publications. 0 1 2 3 685. https://engagedscholarship.csuohio.edu/urban_facpub/685
 "Economy: The Middle Georgia Report". Georgia Trend. Retrieved 2018-07-19.
 "Comprehensive Economic Development Strategy" (PDF). Peach County Development. 2018.
 "Home - Macon Economic Development Commission". Macon Economic Development Commission. Retrieved 2018-07-19.
 "Irving Consumer Products announced plans to locate a $400 million manufacturing plant in Macon-Bibb County, creating 200 jobs". Macon Economic Development Commission. Archived from the original on 2017-11-21. Retrieved 2018-07-19.
 "Thomaston Industrial Park". Thomaston-Upson Industrial Development Authority. 2013-12-13. Retrieved 2018-07-18.
 "Economic Development - Houston County". Houston County Georgia. Retrieved 2018-07-13.
 "Middle Georgia's largest employers". macon. Retrieved 2018-07-13.
 www.thirdwavedigital.com, Third Wave Digital -. "Top 5 Famous People From Milledgeville". www.gatewaymacon.org. Retrieved 2018-07-13.
 www.thirdwavedigital.com, Third Wave Digital -. "Top 5 Famous Macon Actors - Top 5's Everything Else - Gateway Macon". www.gatewaymacon.org. Archived from the original on 2018-07-23. Retrieved 2018-07-13.
 Piazza, Merissa; Andre, Joe; Tsegah, Elorm M.; Lee, Eunkyu; and Austrian, Ziona, "Central Georgia Regional Analysis: Demographics, Economy, Entrepreneurship and Innovation" (2013). Urban Publications. 0 1 2 3 685. https://engagedscholarship.csuohio.edu/urban_facpub/685
 "Comprehensive Economic Development Strategy" (PDF). Peach County Development. 2018.
 "Living in Macon - Why Macon Works - Macon Economic Development Commission". www.maconworks.com. Archived from the original on 2018-07-14. Retrieved 2018-07-19.
 "Ga state park".
 "Macon GA Events | Festivals, Concerts & Farmers Markets". www.maconga.org. Retrieved 2018-07-19.
 "Home - Georgia Peach Festival". www.gapeachfestival.com. Retrieved 2018-07-19.
 "Things to do in Middle Georgia: The Georgia Peach Festival". Warner Robins Real Estate - Warner Robins GA 31088. 2018-05-10. Retrieved 2018-07-19.
 www.thirdwavedigital.com, Third Wave Digital -. "Home - Middle Georgia Regional Airport". iflymacon.com. Retrieved 2018-07-19.
 "Sea Ports - Georgia Department of Economic Development". Georgia Department of Economic Development. Archived from the original on 2018-07-23. Retrieved 2018-07-19.
 "Map of Georgia Cities - Georgia Road Map". geology.com. Retrieved 2018-07-19.
 "Living in Central Georgia". www.thethg.com

Geography of Macon, Georgia
Geography of Bibb County, Georgia
Geography of Houston County, Georgia